Mariam Travélé  (1920 – 14 April 2014) was a teacher, politician and the first First Lady of Mali during the reign of the founding father of Mali, President Modibo Keita after independence. She was noted for her own involvement in the struggle for the independence.

Background 
Mariam was born in Bamako to Moussa Bleni Travélé, first class principal interpreter and author of a French- Bambara dictionary, and his wife Ajibiyé Mintieni. She had her primary education at the Bamako Girls' School from 1931 to 1935. She trained as a teaching instructor at the Foyer de Métisses in Bamako from 1935 to 1939 and earned teachers grade. Travélé and a fellow teacher at a rural school on the river Modibo Keita got married in September 1939. Travélé and her husband Keita worked in cities of French Sudan; Sikasso, Kabara, Timbuktu and Bamako.

During the French colonial rule in the country, Travélé and Keita led the political struggle against the colonial masters. After the dismantling of the RDA sub-section located in Sikasso and the arrest of Modibo Keita by the French colonial administration, Travélé took over the section. In 1962, she chaired the Social Commission for Women, created in the same year with the support of the RDA.

After the military coup of November 19, 1968, which resulted in the imprisonment of Modibo Keita, First Lady Mariam Travélé also spent ten years in detention, including eight and a half years at the Sikasso gendarmerie. She was released on 1 January 1978, one year after the death of her husband, poisoned in 1977 during his detention in Bamako. She was not allowed to attend his funeral.

In 1991, when democracy returned, she was elected vice-president of the Sudanese Union – African Democratic Rally (US-RDA) party, which is now known as the Malian Union for the African Democratic Rally (UM-RDA) since 2010.

Honours 
 Honorary President of the Malian Red Cross 
 Independence Gold Medal

References 

1920 births
2014 deaths
First ladies of Mali
20th-century Malian women politicians
20th-century Malian politicians
Malian educators
Grand Officers of the National Order of Mali
Sudanese Union – African Democratic Rally politicians
Malian prisoners and detainees
People from Bamako
21st-century Malian women